The Hyderabad Public School is located in Ramanthapur, Hyderabad, Telangana, India.

The school was established in 1972. It is a branch of Hyderabad Public School located at Begumpet.  It has over 2300 students in grades PP1 through 12; teaching is in English.  The teacher student ratio is 1:23.  The school is affiliated with the Central Board of Secondary Education, New Delhi, and is a member of Indian Public Schools’ Conference. Admission into the school is through a recently introduced system of drawing lots.  The school is an ethical, non-profitable, co-educational institution.

History 
In 1972, The Hyderabad Public School Society realized the need for another public school. By resolution of the Board of Governors, the society decided to start a new unit. The Late Sri T.B.V. Subhramanyam was entrusted with the project and was appointed the founder principal. Thus a new unit of the Hyderabad Public School came into existence in a rented building at Panjagutta. Later, the Osmania University leased out  (+20 acres for conservation purpose) of land in at Ramanthapur and the school was shifted to its present site.

Facilities 
The school has nine main buildings: the administrative block accommodates the accounts office and the clerical staff, a two storied main academic block, the Principal’s academic office, the Vice-Principal’s office, the staff room, the assembly hall, laboratories, workshop areas, activity rooms and class rooms.

The school is co-ed (since 1986). The boarding facilities are offered for boys only.

There is a 25-bed dispensary, physics, chemistry, biology, and computer laboratories alongside a Mathematics lab.

Divisions 
 Pre-Primary Wing - Classes: PP1 and PP2
 Primary Wing - from Class 1 to 5 
 Secondary Senior Wing - Classes 6 to 12
Each class has five sections A, B, C, D,E and F(Only till 5 class)

Sports and extra-curricular activities
The school in a  closed campus has playgrounds for cricket, hockey, basketball, football, volleyball, badminton, kabaddi, tennis, tennikoit and table tennis. There is a children’s park near the primary wing and parallel bars adjacent to the boarding house.

Societies include the Science Club, the History Society, the Geography Society, the Debating Societies in English, Hindi and Telugu, the Quiz Contest Conclave and Gyaneshwar the Dramatics Society. The children function as the secretaries of the societies under the guidance of the teachers as chairman.

Investiture ceremony and Sports Day are held annually.

School ceremonies and traditions

 Annual Sports Day
 Children’s Day
 Cultural Day
 Independence Day 
 Investiture Ceremony 
 Model United Nations 
 Republic Day 
 School Exhibition
 Teachers Day
 Hindi Divas
 Telugu Divas

Management
The Hyderabad Public School is managed by the Hyderabad Public School Society through its Board of Governors. The Board of Governors comprises:
 Six elected representatives of the Hyderabad Public School Society
 The Vice Chancellor, Osmania University, Hyderabad
 The Vice Chancellor, Jawaharlal Nehru Technological University, Hyderabad.
 Two Nominees of Education Department of Telangana State Government.
 The Principal, The Hyderabad Public School, Begumpet, Hyderabad.
 The Principal, The Hyderabad Public School, Ramanthapur, Hyderabad.
The Executive Body of the Managing Committee of H.P.S. Society also constitutes the Executive Body of the Board of Governors of H.P.S.

The House system
The student body is divided into four houses named after famous Empires:

 Vijayanagara  -  
Nalanda - 
nagarjuna -  
Taxila-

The prefectorial system
The prefectorial system is a tradition of the school. A body of students is invested (in a grand investiture ceremony which includes a parade) with its powers and privileges. The heads of the student body are the Head Boy and Head Girl.

Notable alumni
 Preetish Nijhawan; Co-founder of Akamai Technologies
 Venkatapathy Raju; Indian Cricketer
 Rajiv Chilaka; Founder & MD of Green Gold Animation 
 Anish Kuruvilla; Actor and Film Director
 K. Satish Reddy; Chairman of Dr. Reddy's Laboratories Ltd.
 Ravi Kailas; Chairman of Mytrah Group
 Ash Ashutosh; Founder & CEO of Actifio
 Geddam Srinivas Naidu; Member of the Legislative Assembly

See also
 Education in India
 List of schools in India

References

External links 
 School profile from India Times
 Website

Schools in Hyderabad, India
Educational institutions established in 1972
Boarding schools in Telangana
1972 establishments in Andhra Pradesh